Mendoza Chico is a village or populated centre in the Florida Department of southern-central Uruguay.

Geography

Population
In 2011 Mendoza Chico had a population of 810.
 
Source: Instituto Nacional de Estadística de Uruguay

References

External links
INE map of Mendoza Chico

Populated places in the Florida Department